is a Japanese manga series written and illustrated by Take. It has been serialized through Niconico Seiga's Dra Dra Sharp website since December 2017 and collected in ten tankōbon volumes by Fujimi Shobo as of March 2023. In North America, the manga is licensed by Seven Seas Entertainment. An anime television series adaptation produced by ENGI aired on AT-X from July to September 2020. A second season aired from October to December 2022.

Synopsis 
Hana Uzaki is thrilled to discover that she is attending the same college as her fellow high school upperclassman, Shinichi Sakurai. However, after a year of watching him just laze around, she comes to the conclusion that he has turned into a loner. She decides to spend as much time with Shinichi as possible, believing that he is an introvert or intimidating, which is uncool and unacceptable. Beginning her project to have Shinichi experience a fun lifestyle, Hana stalks him like an annoying pest. Will Shinichi ever make her understand that he prefers doing things by himself, or will he be won over by Hana's zany charm?

Characters

A second-year college student who attends the same college as Shinichi. Despite her curvaceous figure, Hana is sometimes mistaken as an elementary school student because she is petite. A cheerful, beautiful and outgoing student, she is frustrated Shinichi spent his college days mostly alone during her first-year at college. She decides to help him get out of his loner lifestyle by accompanying him wherever he goes, much to Shinichi's annoyance and embarrassment. As the time passes, Hana starts to develop feelings for Shinichi, but she strongly refuses to acknowledge this. 

A third-year college student who is Hana's upperclassman. The two of them first met when they were members of the swimming club during high school. Most co-eds are afraid to approach him due to his intimidating appearance. While Shinichi is often annoyed by Hana's antics, especially those come at his expense, he tolerates them as long as she is having fun during her college life. Eventually, he falls in love with Hana, but he does not want to admit it. He works part-time at a café near their college and is popular among the customers because of his athletic physique and work ethic.

A fourth-year college student who attends the same college as Shinichi and Hana. She works at her father's café. Like her father, she watches Shinichi and Hana from afar to see if their relationship will progress further. She has a muscle fetish towards Shinichi since the first day he worked at the café. 

Shinichi's friend at the college he attends. He is good at sports and popular among girls at the college. When he finds out that Shinichi and Hana often hang out together, Sakaki joins forces with Ami so that he can help the two advance their relationship to the next level.

He is also Ami's father. Knowing that Hana often visits Shinichi whenever he works at the café, he decides to watch both of them from afar with his daughter, wondering if their relationship will advance to the next level. 

Tsuki is Hana's mother. She considers Shinichi's appearance to be scary from the day she met him and mistakenly thinks that Shinichi has taken an interest in her since the day he visited the house, not knowing that he only wanted to pet Hana's cats.

Yanagi is Hana's younger sister. She is in her second year of junior high. She likes to play video games and tease her siblings and parents. She has bangs that cover her eyes.

Kiri is Hana's younger brother. He is a member of the swimming club at his school, though he is not as good at it as Hana and Shinichi are.

Fujio is Hana's father. Despite his overwhelming protectiveness of his children, he greatly respects Shinichi.

Haruko is Shinichi's mother.

Shirō is Shinichi's father.

Nodoka is Shinichi's baby sister. She was born while Shinichi was away in college; as such, he was not aware that he even had a baby sister.

Media

Manga
Uzaki-chan Wants to Hang Out! is written and illustrated by Take. It began serialization through Niconico Seiga's Dra Dra Sharp website on December 1, 2017. The series has been compiled into individual tankōbon volumes. The first volume was published on July 9, 2018. As of March 9, 2023, ten volumes have been published. In North America, the series is licensed by Seven Seas Entertainment, who began publishing it in English on September 17, 2019.

Anime
An anime television series adaptation was announced by Kadokawa on February 3, 2020. The series was animated by ENGI and directed by Kazuya Miura, with Takashi Aoshima handling series composition, Manabu Kurihara designing the characters, and Satoshi Igarashi composing the music. It ran for 12 episodes on AT-X and other channels from July 10 to September 25, 2020. The opening theme, was performed by Kano and Naomi Ōzora (performing as her character, Hana Uzaki), while the ending theme, was performed by YuNi.

On July 3, 2020, Funimation announced at FunimationCon that they had acquired the series, and would stream it on its website in North America and the British Isles, and on AnimeLab in Australia and New Zealand. On September 10, 2020, Funimation announced that the series would receive an English dub, which premiered the following day. Following Sony's acquisition of Crunchyroll, the series was moved to Crunchyroll.

On September 25, 2020, shortly after the first season's finale aired, it was announced that a second season had been greenlit for production.  The second season, titled Uzaki-chan Wants to Hang Out! ω, aired from October 1 to December 24, 2022. Kano and Naomi Ōzora, as her character, Hana Uzaki, performed the opening theme , while MKLNtic performed the ending theme .

Episode list

Uzaki-chan Wants to Hang Out!

Uzaki-chan Wants to Hang Out! ω

Other media
The Japanese Red Cross has used Hana's image to promote blood donation campaigns in 2019 and 2020, with the manga's creator Take also donating blood.

Reception
The manga series ranked on the top 20 web manga list at Da Vinci Magazine and Niconico's Next Manga Awards in 2018.

Notes

References

External links
  
  
 

2017 manga
2020 anime television series debuts
2020s college television series
Anime series based on manga
AT-X (TV network) original programming
Crunchyroll anime
ENGI
Fujimi Shobo manga
Japanese webcomics
Kadokawa Dwango franchises
Romantic comedy anime and manga
Seven Seas Entertainment titles
Shōnen manga
Slice of life anime and manga
Webcomics in print